Johann Georg Edlinger (1 March 1741 – 15 September 1819) was an Austrian portrait painter.

Edlinger was born at Graz in 1741. He was a pupil of Desmarées, and became court painter at Munich, where he died in 1819. His portraits are well painted, and show a leaning towards the works of Rembrandt. Some of his portraits of eminent Bavarians, engraved by Friedrich John, appeared in 1821 under the title Sammlung von Bildnissen denkwürdiger Männer.

References

 

1741 births
1819 deaths
18th-century Austrian painters
18th-century Austrian male artists
Austrian male painters
19th-century Austrian painters
19th-century Austrian male artists
Austrian portrait painters
Artists from Graz
Court painters
Burials at the Alter Südfriedhof